Taylor Seymour (born 17 September 2001) is an English professional footballer who plays as a goalkeeper for Isthmian League Premier Division club Horsham.

Career
Seymour is a graduate of the Lewes academy, featuring twice for the Rooks first team in cup matches.

Seymour signed his first professional contract with Portsmouth on 15 September 2020 following a successful trial. He made his professional debut with Portsmouth in a 5–1 EFL Trophy loss to Peterborough United on 12 January 2021.

In August 2021, he joined Isthmian League South East Division club Burgess Hill Town.

On 7 January 2022, Seymour signed for EFL League Two club Crawley Town on a contract until the end of the season.

On 16 August 2022, Seymour signed for Eastbourne Borough. In November 2022, Seymour signed for Corinthian-Casuals on a dual-registration basis.

In February 2023, Seymour was the first recipient of the Golden Gloves Award for 2023.

Career statistics

References

External links
 
 Portsmouth FC Profile

2001 births
Living people
English footballers
Association football goalkeepers
Lewes F.C. players
Portsmouth F.C. players
Burgess Hill Town F.C. players
Eastbourne Borough F.C. players
Crawley Town F.C. players
Corinthian-Casuals F.C. players
National League (English football) players
Isthmian League players